Mount Aloysius College is a private Catholic college in Cresson, Pennsylvania. It was founded in 1853 and is conducted under the tradition of the Sisters of Mercy. The college is located on a 193-acre campus in the Allegheny Mountains.

History 
Mount Aloysius College was established in 1853 by a small community of sisters from the Sisters of Mercy, during which time St. Aloysius Academy was constructed in a tinner's shop in Loretto, PA. In 1897, the academy moved to its present location in Cresson. Through an initiative of Sister Mary de Sales Farley, R.S.M., the academy became Mount Aloysius Junior College in 1939. Then, in 1991, the college expanded and amended its charter to allow the conferment of bachelor's degrees. In 2000, the college's charter was amended again to include master's degrees.

Academics 
Mount Aloysius College is a liberal arts college that awards associate, bachelor's, and master's degrees in the arts and sciences fields. The undergraduate enrollment totals approximately 3,000 students. There are over 70 undergraduate and graduate programs students can choose to study at the college. The college has an 11 to 1 student to faculty ratio and an average class size of 14,

Campus 
The college is situated 90 minutes east of Pittsburgh and 25 minutes west of Altoona, Pa. It is in the Allegheny Mountains region of west-central Pennsylvania. The campus covers 193 acres of beautiful mountain land, and the area surrounding campus features 250 miles of hiking trails, as well as other outdoor activities.

Academic and administrative buildings
 Administration Building - "Main" was constructed in 1890 and is home to many classrooms, faculty offices, and the college's administrative offices. The Mount Aloysius College Wolf-Kuhn Gallery and the Health Services and Counseling and Disability Services are also located here. 
 Academic Hall - Academic is the home of the college's psychology, history/political science, religious studies, American Sign Language/English interpreting, and pre-law courses. The ASL/EI department's interactive labs and customized classrooms are located here. 
 Pierce Hall/The Learning Center for Health Science and Technology - Pierce's renovations were completed in 2018, and now the building offers medical simulation labs, as well as meeting rooms and study areas.

Residential buildings
 Ihmsen Hall - This traditionally freshman residence hall houses approximately 200 male and female students in double rooms, with two rooms sharing a bathroom. 
 McAuley Hall - The newest residence hall, McAuley houses 102 male and female students in double rooms with shared bathrooms between rooms. McAuley also has several large meeting rooms and study rooms. 
 Misciagna Hall - Each room in this apartment-style residence hall features a small kitchenette, two bedrooms, a bathroom, and a common area. 
 Saint Gertrude's Hall - "St. Gert's" is a traditionally freshman residence hall featuring limited single rooms and community-style bathrooms. 
 Saint Joseph's Hall - "St. Joe's" is a traditionally freshman residence hall with larger, quad rooms and community-style bathrooms.

Student Life Facilities

 Cosgrave Student Center - Named after Mother Mary Gertrude Cosgrave, one of the founders of the college, Cosgrave is the center of campus and student life. It includes the college bookstore, an on-campus daycare center, dining facilities, campus police, and student activities offices, as well as study areas and meeting rooms. 
 Bertschi Center & Technology Commons - A great place for commuters to hang out and study. Students can hang out in the self-serve cafe and study lounge. The multipurpose room in the back of the building is used for banquets, ceremonies, and many other on-campus events. 
 Alumni Hall - Built in 1904, Alumni Hall is one of the oldest buildings on campus. It is home to the college's theatre, which also doubles as a large lecture hall. The building is also used for admissions and other student events. 
 Library - The library hosts the college's learning commons, a place for students to study, practice presentations, get help from peer and professional tutors, and attend academic workshops. The library also has classrooms on the ground floor and in the basement. 
 Our Lady of Mercy Chapel - Built in 1922, the chapel hosts mass regularly for students and community members.

Athletic facilities
 Athletic Convocation and Wellness Center - This 84,000 square foot building comfortably seats 2,500 people. The building includes main and auxiliary gyms, a wellness center, athletes-only weight room, classrooms, indoor batting cages, soccer equipment, and offices. 
 Ray and Louise Walker Athletic Field Complex - This complex includes the Calandra-Smith Baseball Field, as well as the college's softball field, soccer/lacrosse field, and tennis courts, as well as the Mountie Stables, which houses the college's press box and home and away locker rooms, and plenty of seating for fans. 
 Soccer & Lacrosse Field - The Mountie field was upgraded in the summer of 2018 with a new artificial turf surface, lighting for night practices and games, and stadium seating. 
 Calandra-Smith Baseball Field - The Calandra-Smith Baseball Field features a turfed infield, dugouts, electronic scoreboard, and plenty of seating for fans. 
 Tennis Courts - The four courts are Mountie Blue and a great area for practice and games. 
 Softball Field - Located adjacent to the Mountie Stables, the softball field is home to the Mount's women's softball team.

Athletics 
The Mounties varsity sports teams compete in the NCAA Division III in the Allegheny Mountain Collegiate Conference.

Men's sports 
 Baseball
 Basketball
 Cross country
 Golf
 Soccer
 Tennis
 Volleyball

Women's sports
 Basketball
 Bowling
 Cross country
 Golf 
 Lacrosse
 Soccer
 Softball
 Tennis
 Volleyball

Notable alumni
 Patricia Egan Jones, a politician who has represented the 5th Legislative District in the New Jersey General Assembly since 2015.

References

External links

 
Sisters of Mercy colleges and universities
Educational institutions established in 1853
Universities and colleges in Cambria County, Pennsylvania
1853 establishments in Pennsylvania
Catholic universities and colleges in Pennsylvania
Liberal arts colleges in Pennsylvania